Scrap Mechanic is a sandbox video game developed for Windows by Swedish game studio and publisher Axolot Games, in which players can build machines, vehicles, and buildings, and share their creations online. The initial version of the game, released on January 20, 2016, was a creative mode with unlimited access to all available parts for building. On the day of its release, it was the top-selling game on Steam and is estimated to have 1–2 million sales. The survival mode update for the game, with new game mechanics including wildlife, scavenging, farming, and cooking, as well as an underwater biome, was released on May 7, 2020. It was the third-best-selling game on Steam the week after the update.

Gameplay

Survival mode
Players begin at the site of a crashed spaceship, with very few items. They must search for supplies and food in order to survive. The spaceship has a basic crafting station called a Craftbot with limited functionality, primarily focused on allowing players to build a simple automobile to begin exploring the world.

The second major location in the game is the mechanic station, where most complex crafting can be undertaken with the other crafting stations: the large Craftbot; the Dressbot, for making clothes; the Refinebot, for refining raw materials; and the Cookbot, for combining raw foods into recipes. The cheapest item is the Resource Collector used for collecting resources and transmitting them to refiners. Other locations include ruined structures like the Silo District or Ruin City filled with enemy robots, supply crates, and chests with loot; the Trader's Outpost or Hideout, where items can be purchased with Produce Crates and Caged Farmers; the Roadside Markets that can be harvested for blocks, parts and other resources; and warehouses, large buildings storing more advanced supplies filled with Tapebots guarding the warehouse with their clippers and tape guns.

The world is inhabited by a variety of robots that attack the players on sight. These include:
spider-like Totebots, which are the most basic of them all and whose heads can be used to make alarms, music and deter other bots. Their original purpose is unknown, thought likely to herd cattle; Haybots are, most likely, the second enemy you will encounter in the world. They wield a pitchfork and drop scrap metal rods (which can be refined into blocks for crafting and building). Were originally used to manage the wheat fields and stack hay. They have a weakness in form of water, which can be used against them: they never go swim, and get stunned if you water them with a bucket; Tapebots, who guard warehouses and shoot tape rolls (At higher floors they use firecracker rolls instead, which are explosive) at intruders. They are also the most dangerous bots. Those were originally used to do packaging jobs at said warehouses; and the large Farmbots, that wield a pesticide gun and a large scythe. They also hold the key to the warehouses. Were originally used to automatically do majority of the farming jobs. In Devblog 20 and 21 new bots have been shown, those being: Red Totebots (referred to by the developers as Red Guys), they are confirmed to use explosives but the way they will work is yet to be announced; Cable Cutter Bots, they will be found in groups in the caves coming in Chapter 2; and the Trashbot, according to the developers, the first boss of scrap mechanic, it will be found on the roof of the warehouses.

Players can also find a farmer(or trader) with whom they can trade for special items including spudguns, garment boxes, seeds and ammunition (potato). The farmer accepts produce crates as currency as well as caged farmers that can be found at burnt and autumn forests campsites.

In later stages of the game, building advanced bases and elaborate machines is possible.  Resources can be collected more efficiently using better machines, and farming automation through creations (and the required defenses for nightly raids) make larger scale conflicts with the bots possible.

As of update 0.5.1 most items are available in creative mode except for structure parts, the dressbot and cookbot and other parts like garment boxes, small chests, most consumables, etc.

Several elements described here (such as Farmbots dropping warehouse keys) are subject to change in later versions as the game is still in early access.

Creative mode 
In creative mode, players start with full access to an unlimited supply of all items in the game, allowing for the creation of a variety of buildings, vehicles, and machines, none of which require energy or fuel to function. There are no enemies nor animals in the world naturally, but they can be spawned by the player with spawn capsules. In this mode, players cannot be injured or die. There are also harvestables from survival mode such as trees and stone as well as crafting stations, allowing for players to test all sorts of mad resource gathering contraptions. Creations can be saved and shared via the Steam workshop.

Challenge mode 
In challenge mode, players have to try and get through 50 levels by making or fixing contraptions using the limited materials they are given. A challenge builder is also available for players to build and share their own challenge levels. Levels can be downloaded and published in the Steam workshop.
Originally, challenge mode was a developer's experiment with encryption mechanics, not allowing buildings to be deleted, which has evolved into its whole separate game mode.

Backstory 
The survival backstory depicts the setting of the game and can be found on the Scrap Mechanic Steam store page.

It portrays a robot maintenance mechanic that has been sent to an agricultural planet which supplies food to the metropolitan planets. The crew has been tasked to maintain fully autonomous farming robots which overrun the planet. However, as the spacecraft comes in for a landing it loses control and crashes. The mechanic survives the impact however becomes stranded and finds out the robots working in the fields have become hostile and start attacking the mechanics. The goal is now to survive on the planet, using the mechanics quick thinking, creativity and environment as an advantage to stay alive from the savage robots. 

As the game is still in development, more story elements are expected to be revealed over time.

Engine 
Scrap Mechanic formerly used the OGRE rendering engine, which stands for Object-Oriented Graphics Rendering Engine. It was used alongside a custom plugin named Bullet, which is an external physics engine responsible for all of the physics calculations in Scrap Mechanic. 

However, the engine was changed with the first major update, being version 0.2.0 (otherwise known as the Winter Update). As mentioned in Devblog 8, the new in-house rendering engine had been in development since August and was made to fix numerous bugs, mostly related to certain integrated Intel cards, which some players had issues with.

Reception 
Angus Morrison of PC Gamer compared the game to Minecraft, noting that in the context of the latter's lack of mechanical building conditions, the game might be attractive to players who like to build mechanics.

Nathan Grayson of Kotaku said that the game "striked him as a game intrepid builders won’t tire of anytime soon," and claimed that he was looking forward to seeing what comes of it.

References

External links 
 Official website
 Developer website
 Scrap Mechanic Mods

Upcoming video games
Early access video games
Open-world video games
Survival video games
Video games developed in Sweden
Windows games
Windows-only games
Multiplayer and single-player video games